Jorge Martín Núñez Mendoza (born 22 January 1978) is a Paraguayan former footballer who played as a defender.

He scored 1 goal in 18 caps for Paraguay, as of July 2007. He started his career in Club Guaraní and then moved to Cerro Porteño. Afterwards he played for several Argentine teams such as Banfield, Arsenal de Sarandí and Racing Club. Between 2005 and 2006, he played for Estudiantes de La Plata.

He had an opportunity to have a trial for Sheffield United at the start of the 2006–2007 season of the Premier League but opted against it as he was called up for international duty.

In 2007 Núñez returned to Paraguay to play for Cerro Porteño. In July 2008 he signed a contract with the Argentine team Rosario Central. In August 2009 he was loaned to Chacarita Juniors.

On 12 July 2010, Rubio Ñu signed him to improve the squad.

External links

 Argentine Primera statistics

Paraguayan footballers
1978 births
Living people
Club Atlético Banfield footballers
Arsenal de Sarandí footballers
Racing Club de Avellaneda footballers
Estudiantes de La Plata footballers
Cerro Porteño players
Club Guaraní players
Club Rubio Ñu footballers
Rosario Central footballers
Chacarita Juniors footballers
General Caballero Sport Club footballers
Independiente F.B.C. footballers
Argentine Primera División players
Paraguayan expatriate footballers
Expatriate footballers in Argentina
Association football fullbacks
Paraguay international footballers
2006 FIFA World Cup players
Cerro Porteño managers
Paraguayan football managers
Deportivo Capiatá managers
Independiente F.B.C. managers